The 2018–19 UNC Greensboro Spartans men's basketball team represented the University of North Carolina at Greensboro during the 2018–19 NCAA Division I men's basketball season. The Spartans finished the season 29–7, 15–3 in SoCon play, and were the SoCon regular season runners-up. They defeated Samford and Furman before falling to regular season champion Wofford in the title game of the SoCon Tournament. They received an at-large bid to the National Invitation Tournament where they beat Campbell in the first round before losing to eventual tournament runners-up Lipscomb.

Previous season
The Spartans finished the 2017–18 season 27–8, 15–3 in SoCon play, and were the SoCon regular season champions. They defeated The Citadel, Wofford, and East Tennessee State to become champions of the SoCon tournament. They received the SoCon's automatic bid to the NCAA tournament where they lost in the first round to Gonzaga.

Roster

Schedule and results

|-
!colspan=9 style=| Non-conference regular season

|-
!colspan=9 style=| SoCon regular season

|-
!colspan=9 style=| SoCon tournament

|-
!colspan=9 style=| NIT

Source:

References

UNC Greensboro Spartans men's basketball seasons
UNC Greensboro
UNC Greensboro Spartans men's basketball
UNC Greensboro Spartans men's basketball
UNC Greensboro